Dream Big or DreamBig may refer to:

 Dream Big (album), an album by Ryan Shupe & the RubberBand
 "Dream Big", an episode of Season 11 of Barney & Friends
 "Dream Big" (Jazmine Sullivan song), 2009
 "Dream Big" (David Cook song), 2008
 Dream Big: Engineering Our World, a 2017 film by MacGillivray Freeman
DreamBIG Children's Festival in Adelaide, South Australia